This is a list of Odd Job Jack episodes.

Season 1

Season 2

Season 3

Season 4

Notes
Source for Season Tables

Odd Job Jack